Molla Barir Bou is a Bangladeshi Bengali-language film, directed by Bangladeshi famous television drama director-writer Salauddin Lavlu and written by famous actor-writer ATM Shamsuzzaman. Produced and distributed by Chhayachhando Chalochitra. Stars Moushumi, Riaz, Shabnur, ATM Shamsuzzaman, Pran Roy, Chitralekha Guho, Keramat Mawla, Khairul Alam Sabuj, Wahida Mollick Jolly, Masud Ali Khan and many more.

Molla Barir Bou is a fully family drama based film. The film released was 2005 in all over Bangladesh. And gets a great popularity from all categories film viewers of Bangladesh. Also honor as gets won Lux-Channel I Performance Awards best director 2005. This film is selected for preservation in Bangladesh Film Archive.

Plot
The charming story of the film is picked up from village life of our country. The mischief of the so-called 'Molla' who has no knowledge except fanatic sentiments perturbed all. His home is the seat of an oppressive regime.

Cast

Crew
 Director: Salauddin Lavlu
 Chief Assistant Director: Azharul Alam Babu
 Producer: Chhayachhando Chalochitra
 Story: ATM Shamsuzzaman
 Screenplay: Salauddin Lavlu
 Dialog: Masum Reza
 Script: Masum Reza
 Music: Imon Saha
 Lyrics: Shah Alam Sarkar and Kabir Bokul
 Cinematography: Hasan Ahmmed
 Editing: Fazley Haque
 Distributor: Chhayachhando Chalochitra
 Choreography: Masum Babul
 Set: Jashim and Selim
 Dress: Imdadul Haque Khokon
 Song Recording: Tan Recording Studio
 Dubbing: Dobni Chitra

Technical details
 Format: 35 MM (color)
 Year of the Product: 2004
 Technical Support: Bangladesh Film Development Corporation (BFDC)

Award and achievements

Lux-Channel I Performance Awards
 Winner Best Director: Salauddin Lavlu 2005.

Music

The film's music was directed by Imon Saha. Lyrics by Shah Alam Sarkar and Kabir Bokul, and playback singers Andrew Kishore, Sabina Yasmin, Momotaj, Monir Khan, Asif Akbar, Baby Nazmin and Kanak Chapa.

Soundtrack

Box office
Molla Barir Bou was released in 2005 in Bangladesh, and was considered a blockbuster at the box office.

References

External links
 

2005 films
2005 comedy-drama films
Bengali-language Bangladeshi films
Bangladeshi comedy-drama films
Films scored by Emon Saha
2000s Bengali-language films
2005 comedy films
2005 drama films